Holden railway station is a long closed railway station on the Bendigo railway in Melbourne, Victoria, Australia. It opened on 1 January 1860, and closed on 31 December 1860.

Location 

The station buildings were moved to Gisborne station in a contract let in 1861.

References

External links
 Railpage Australia Forums: Thread on Holden station

 

Railway stations in Australia opened in 1860
Railway stations closed in 1860
Disused railway stations in Victoria (Australia)
Disused railway stations in Melbourne